Mark Leslie Quayle (born 2 October 1978) is an English former footballer.

He played for Everton, Notts County, Grantham Town, Morecambe, Telford United, Nuneaton Borough, Chester City, Scarborough, Northwich Victoria, Hyde United and Colwyn Bay. Quayle scored a lot of goals in the non-league game including a crucial winning goal against Southend in a third round FA Cup replay, which secured Scarborough a lucrative home tie against Chelsea in the next round.

Honours
Individual
Football Conference Goalscorer of the Month: August 2002

References

1978 births
Living people
English footballers
Association football forwards
Everton F.C. players
Notts County F.C. players
Grantham Town F.C. players
Morecambe F.C. players
Telford United F.C. players
Nuneaton Borough F.C. players
Chester City F.C. players
Scarborough F.C. players
Northwich Victoria F.C. players
English Football League players
National League (English football) players
Footballers from Liverpool